"Higher" is the fourth single by English drum and bass duo Sigma from their debut studio album Life (2015). It was written by TMS, Tom Hull and Wayne Hector. It features the vocals from English singer Labrinth. The song was released as a digital download in the United Kingdom on 22 March 2015. The song peaked at number 12 on the UK Singles Chart.

Music video
A music video to accompany the release of "Higher" was first released onto YouTube on 13 February 2015 at a total length of three minutes and five seconds (03:05).

Track listing
Digital download
"Higher" (featuring Labrinth) – 3:01

Digital download – remix bundle
"Higher" (Sigma VIP remix) – 3:52
"Higher" (GRADES remix) – 6:52
"Higher" (Grant Nelson remix) – 6:05
"Higher" (Kideko remix) – 4:58
"Higher" (Jay Montero club mix) – 4:17
"Higher" (Lucas Maverick remix) – 4:46

Charts

Certifications

Release history

In popular culture
The song was used as an online trailer for the BBC One drama Casualty. The song was also used in the introduction of the Sky Sports Super Sunday, used during the 2015–16 and 2016–17 seasons.

"Higher" was featured in the Madden NFL 16 soundtrack. The song was also used when the players walked onto the court during the 2015 Barclays ATP World Tour Finals.

Swisse Australia also promoted this song in preparation for the 2016 Summer Olympics. It was later featured in the end credits of the film Collide.

References

2015 songs
2015 singles
Sigma songs
Labrinth songs
Songs written by Peter Kelleher (songwriter)
Songs written by Ben Kohn
Songs written by Tom Barnes (songwriter)
Songs written by Kid Harpoon
Songs written by Wayne Hector
Song recordings produced by TMS (production team)
All Around the World Productions singles